Gozdawa is a Polish nobility Coat of Arms. It was used by several szlachta families in the times of the Kingdom of Poland and the Polish–Lithuanian Commonwealth.

History
It is believed that the Gozdawa coat of arms was granted by Władysław I Herman to the knight Krystyn z Gozdawy (Krystyn from Gozdawa) for bravery on the battlefield in the 11th century. The lily symbolizes the immaculate knighthood and the peacock feathers in the crest represent wisdom.

Notable bearers
Notable bearers of this Coat of Arms include:

 Pac family
 Jan Mikulicz-Radecki
 Stefan Lech Sokołowski

Gallery

See also
 Polish heraldry
 Heraldic family
 List of Polish nobility coats of arms

Bibliography
 Tadeusz Gajl: Herbarz polski od średniowiecza do XX wieku : ponad 4500 herbów szlacheckich 37 tysięcy nazwisk 55 tysięcy rodów. L&L, 2007. .

References

Polish coats of arms